Canterbury is a small settlement in the locality of Windorah in Shire of Barcoo in Central West Queensland, Australia.

Geography 
Canterbury's closest neighbour is Morney which is also the name of its closest river.  It is located on the Diamantina Developmental Road.

History
Canterbury Post Office opened on 1 January 1891 (a receiving office had been open from 1888) and closed in 1920.

References

External links
 Map showing location of Canterbury

Towns in Queensland
Central West Queensland
Shire of Barcoo

Education 
The Canterbury College has been delivering Excellent education for prices as low as $7,172 per term.